Van de Sande Bakhuyzen is a Dutch family with a number of notable members. The family name originated in The Hague with Hendrik van de Sande Bakhuyzen, son of the prominent publisher Gerrit Bakhuysen (1758–1843) and Jacoba van de Sande (1757–1815). In 1819, Hendrik obtained a legal permission by royal decree to add his late mother's surname to his own, before marrying Sophia Wilhelmine Kiehl (1804–1881) in 1825. "Bakhuyzen" can also be spelled "Bakhuijzen" and, especially before 1811, can also be found written as "Backhuijsen", "Backhuysen", "Bakhuijsen", and "Bakhuizen".

In 1994, the family was included in the genealogical reference book Nederland's Patriciaat.

Notable members
Hendrik van de Sande Bakhuyzen (1795–1860), landscape painter and art teacher
Gerardina Jacoba van de Sande Bakhuyzen (1826–1895), still life and flower painter
Willem Hendrik van de Sande Bakhuyzen (1831–1919), minister and head of a gymnasium
Willem Hendrik van de Sande Bakhuyzen  (1888–1946), patent attorney 
Nicolaas Jan van de Sande Bakhuyzen (1924–1980), judge and court president
Willem van de Sande Bakhuyzen (1957–2005), film director
Matthijs van de Sande Bakhuyzen (born 1988), movie and television actor
 (born 1992), movie and television actress
Julius van de Sande Bakhuyzen (1835–1925), etcher and painter, co—founder of the Hague School
Hendricus Gerardus van de Sande Bakhuyzen (1838–1923), astronomer, director of the Leiden Observatory
 (1874–1951), Mayor of Leiden from 1927 to 1945
Ernst Frederik van de Sande Bakhuyzen (1848–1918), astronomer, director of the Leiden Observatory

See also
Bakhuysen (crater), Martian crater named after Hendricus Gerardus vdS B
Ludolf Bakhuizen (1630–1708), a seemingly unrelated Dutch painter born in East Frisia

References
Nederland's Patriciaat 78 (1994), p. 1-15.

Dutch patrician families

de:Sande Bakhuyzen
nl:Backhuijsen